Medical Decision Making is a peer-reviewed academic journal that publishes papers in the fields of decision-making and medical informatics. Its editor-in-chief is Brian Zikmund-Fisher (University of Michigan). It was established in 1981 and is currently published by SAGE Publications on behalf of the Society for Medical Decision Making. A sister open access journal focusing on applications of medical decision making, Medical Decision Making Policy & Practice, began publishing in 2016.

Abstracting and indexing
The journal is abstracted and indexed in MEDLINE, Scopus, Science Citation Index Expanded, and the Social Sciences Citation Index. According to the Journal Citation Reports, its 2020 impact factor is 2.583, ranking it 21st out of 30 journals in the category "Medical Informatics", 59th out of 108 journals in the category "Health Care Sciences & Services", and 42nd out of 88 journals in the category "Health Policy & Services"

Editors
The following persons have been editors-in-chief of the journal:
Lee B. Lusted, 1981–1985
Dennis G. Fryback, 1986–1988
J. Robert Beck, 1989–1994
Arthur S. Elstein, 1995–1999
Frank A. Sonnenberg, 2000–2004
Mark Helfand, 2005–2012
Alan J. Schwartz, 2013-2020
Brian J. Zikmund-Fisher, 2021-2025

References

External links

SAGE Publishing academic journals
English-language journals
Bimonthly journals
Biomedical informatics journals
Publications established in 1981